This is a list of the longest team losing streaks in Major League Baseball history. Streaks started at the end of one season are carried over into the following season. Two lists are provided—one with streaks that consist entirely of regular-season games and one with streaks of playoff games only.

The 1889 Louisville Colonels hold the record for the longest losing streak in official MLB history at 26 games, though the 1875 Brooklyn Atlantics lost 31 consecutive games in the National Association, a number that is not considered official by MLB. In the modern two-league era, the longest losing streak belongs to the 1961 Philadelphia Phillies at 23 games. In the American League, the 1988 Baltimore Orioles hold the record at 21 games. The longest losing streak consisting entirely of postseason games is 18; belonging to the Minnesota Twins (2004–present).

The longest losing streak by a defending World Series Champion is 11, by the 1998 Florida Marlins (now the Miami Marlins) and the 1986 Kansas City Royals.

Key

Streak

Regular season
This list contains only the top 20 streaks consisting entirely of regular-season games.

Playoffs
This list contains only streaks consisting entirely of postseason games.

World Series
This list contains only streaks consisting entirely of World Series games.

Regular season and playoffs
This list includes streaks that involve both regular season games and games which occurred in the playoffs.

Footnotes
The Philadelphia Athletics folded following the 1890 season without breaking their losing streak.

See also
List of Major League Baseball longest winning streaks
List of Major League Baseball franchise postseason droughts
List of National Basketball Association longest losing streaks

References
Baseball-Reference.com – Team Winning and Losing Streaks Analyzer

Streaks
Lists of worsts